Sonnet 103 is one of 154 sonnets written by the English playwright and poet William Shakespeare. It is a member of the Fair Youth sequence, in which the poet expresses his love towards a young man.

Synopsis
The poet says that his feeble lines cannot do justice to the subject's beauty, but merely mar it with their own inadequacy. The poet's only achievements are the result of that beauty, which is much more clearly visible simply by looking in a mirror.

Structure 
Sonnet 103 is an English or Shakespearean sonnet. The English sonnet has three quatrains, followed by a final rhyming couplet. It follows the typical rhyme scheme of the form ABAB CDCD EFEF GG and is composed in iambic pentameter, a type of poetic metre based on five pairs of metrically weak/strong syllabic positions. The 7th line exemplifies a regular iambic pentameter:

  ×  / ×   /    ×   /   ×  /   ×   / 
That over-goes my blunt invention quite,

 /  ×    ×  /     ×    /×    /  ×   / 
Dulling my lines, and doing me disgrace. (103.7-8)
/ = ictus, a metrically strong syllabic position. × = nonictus.

This is followed (in line 8) by a common metrical variation: the initial reversal, which also occurs in line 6. Inversions may also occur mid-line, as in line 9's "striving".

Notes

References

British poems
Sonnets by William Shakespeare